Jikata may refer to the following:

 Jikata, Niger.
 a jikata (地方) is a geisha who specializes in singing and playing musical instruments. The name meaning "earth person" refers to their seated position.